Casa Mariquit is a heritage house in Iloilo City, Philippines. The house is located on Santa Isabel Street in the district of Jaro. It is considered the oldest heritage house in Iloilo, built in 1803.

The centuries-old house is owned by one of the most influential old families in Iloilo, Javellana and Lopez kin, and is one of the most well-maintained heritage houses in Iloilo. It still contains much of its original furniture and old framed photographs hanging on the walls.

History 
Casa Mariquit was built in 1803 as both a bank and a residence by a banker, Ramon Javellana. It eventually became a home for his granddaughter, Maria Salvacion Javellana, whose nickname is Mariquit, which means "beautiful" in Filipino, and his husband, Fernando Lopez, Sr., who served as the Vice President of the Philippines from 1949 to 1953 under President Elpidio Quirino and from 1965 to 1972 under President Ferdinand Marcos.

In February 1981, Pope John Paul II visited and blessed the house himself during his visit to Iloilo.

In 1993, after the former Vice President died, his great-grandson, Robert Lopez Puckett Jr., commenced the restoration of the house. The Casa Mariquit is still now under the care of him, who is also one of Solaready Inc.'s founders.

References 

Buildings and structures in Iloilo City
Houses completed in 1803
Heritage Houses in the Philippines
Tourist attractions in Iloilo City